Frieda Gijbels (born 1975) is a Belgian politician and a member of the Flemish N-VA party.

Biography
Gijbels studied dentistry at the KULeuven and specialized in periodontics. In 2003 she became a dentist-periodontist and also obtained a doctorate in medical sciences. She is the founder of a periodontology practice in Oudsbergen. In the 2019 Belgian federal election, she was elected to the Member of the Chamber of Representatives on third place on the Limburg constituency list.

References

1975 births
Living people
Members of the Chamber of Representatives (Belgium)
New Flemish Alliance politicians
Catholic University of Leuven alumni
21st-century Belgian politicians
21st-century Belgian women politicians